Doha conference can refer to several meetings held in Doha, Qatar:
 The WTO Ministerial Conference of 2001
 leading to the Doha Development Round
 and the Doha Declaration on the TRIPS Agreement and Public Health
 2008 follow-up conference to the Monterrey Consensus
 Doha Agreement (2008) between rival Lebanese factions
 Hamas–Fatah Doha agreement (2012)
 2012 United Nations Climate Change Conference
 Doha Agreement (2020) between the United States and the Taliban